bigLove is a 2001 short film written and directed by Leif Tilden. It was first shown on January 19, 2001, at the Sundance Film Festival. It won the award for Best Short at the 2001 Flickapalooza Film Festival, and both Best Director of an HD Film and Best High-Definition Short at the 2001 HDFest.

Plot
Two loving parents, Phoebe and Nate, find themselves hard pressed to emotionally deal with the fact that their kids are going off to school for the first time. However, the kids themselves, Samson and Deliah, are dealing with it in a very adult-like manner.

Cast
 Sam Rockwell as Nate
 Mary McCormack as Phoebe
 Emma Roberts as Delilah
 Kane Ritchotte as Samson
 Kelly Nickels as The Bus Driver

References

External links
 
 "bigLove" at iFilm

2001 films
2001 short films
American short films
2000s English-language films